Coolmore House is a Georgian house located near Carrigaline, County Cork, Ireland.

History 
Built in 1788 by W.W. Newewnham (father of Edward Newenham), Coolmore House is on the site of an older building from the late 1600s. This site has been the ancestral home of the Newenham family since that time. The property was still owned by the Newenham family as of 2014.

As of 2022, the house is in a derelict state.

Trivia 

In the 1983 television adaption of Molly Keane's Good Behaviour, Coolmore House was used as the fictional setting of Temple Alice.

A painting of the house was commissioned by the Newenhams in 1809 by Gaspare Gabrielli. It sold for £156,500 at auction in 2007.

References 

Buildings and structures completed in 1788
Buildings and structures in County Cork